Joe Arquette (born 1981 in El Paso, Texas) is an American actor.

He starred in the title role in the feature G.I. Jesus. The film won the grand jury prize at the 2006 CineVegas Film Festival. He also appeared in the Kevin Costner film The Guardian.

External links 
 
 Joe Arquette's resume

1981 births
Male actors from El Paso, Texas
Living people
People from El Paso, Texas
American male actors of Mexican descent